may refer to:

 , the smallest prefecture of Japan by area, located on the island of Shikoku
 , a district in Kagawa Prefecture
 , a town located in Kagawa District
 , train station in Chigasaki, Kanagawa Prefecture
 Kagawa (surname)
 6665 Kagawa, a main-belt asteroid